Marcus Edward Denmon II (born March 20, 1990) is an American professional basketball player for Peristeri of the Greek Basket League. He played for the University of Missouri. He was taken 59th overall by the San Antonio Spurs in the 2012 NBA draft.

High school career
In his senior season at Hogan Preparatory Academy, Denmon averaged 28.5 points and 5.8 rebounds while leading Hogan Prep to the Class 3 State Championships. He won the 2008 DiRenna Award as the top high school player in Kansas City.

College recruitment

|}

College career
Denmon committed to attend the University of Missouri on August 20, 2007.

A reserve his freshman and sophomore seasons, Denmon started 33 out of 34 games his junior season. As a junior, Denmon averaged 16.9 points per game while earning All-Big 12 First Team, NABC All-District, and USBWA All-District honors.

On August 3, 2011, Denmon was named to the 2011 USA Basketball Men's World University Games roster.

As a senior, Denmon 17.7 points per game and 5 rebounds per game, earning second-team Consensus All-American, All-Big 12 First team, and USBWA All-District honors. Denmon was also a finalist for the John R. Wooden Award.

With 107 victories, teammates Denmon, Kim English, Laurence Bowers, and Steve Moore won more games than any senior class in Mizzou basketball history.

Professional career

Europe
On July 25, 2012, Denmon signed a one-year contract with the French Pro A League club Élan Chalon. On October 5, 2012, Denmon suffered a broken foot in the team's opening game against ASVEL Basket. After undergoing surgery, Denmon returned to play on January 26, 2013 against JDA Dijon Basket. After the season, he then signed a 1-year contract with the Tofas S.K. of the Turkish Basketball League.

On August 16, 2014, Denmon was signed by Italian team New Basket Brindisi.

On August 3, 2015, Denmon returned to Turkey and signed with İstanbul Büyükşehir Belediyespor.

On September 27, 2016, Denmon signed with Gaziantep Basketbol.

On July 12, 2017, Denmon signed a two-year (1+1) contract with Greek club Panathinaikos. His team option was picked up on June 25, 2018, and he was bound to remain with the Euroleague team for another campaign. However, his contract was bought out by Chinese club Zhejiang Golden Bulls a month later.

On June 25, 2019, Denmon's return option to Panathinaikos was exercised by the EuroLeague club, after his successful stint in China. The new, two-year contract was put into dispute by Denmon's manager, Miško Ražnatović and Panathinaikos accepted to accommodate the player's demand, providing that he pays the designated 250.000€ contract buy-out.

China
On July 25, 2018, Denmon signed with the Zhejiang Golden Bulls of the Chinese Basketball Association (CBA). He averaged 33.5 points per game in the 2018–2019 season and 28.4 points per game in the 2019–2020 season. On September 10, 2020, Denmon signed with the Shanghai Sharks. He averaged 17.7 points, 3.7 assists, 3.4 rebounds, and 1.1 steals per game. On January 23, 2022, Denmon signed with the Beijing Royal Fighters.

Return to Europe
On February 24, 2022, Denmon signed with Petkim Spor of the Turkish Basketball Super League.

On July 6, 2022, Denmon returned to Greece, signing with Peristeri of the Greek Basket League and the Basketball Champions League.

NBA draft rights
Denmon was drafted on June 28, 2012 by the San Antonio Spurs with the 59th selection in the draft. The Spurs retained his draft rights until they renounced them on September 23, 2016.

Career statistics

EuroLeague

|-
| style="text-align:left;"| 2017–18
| style="text-align:left;" rowspan=1| Panathinaikos
| 28 || 8 || 13.0 || .391 || .417 || .833 || 0.8 || 0.3 || 0.5 || 0.2 || 5.6 || 3.8
|- class="sortbottom"
| style="text-align:left;"| Career
| style="text-align:left;"|
| 28 || 8 || 13.0 || .391 || .417 || .833 || 0.8 || 0.3 || 0.5 || 0.2 || 5.6 || 3.8

Personal life
On December 7, 2010, Denmon's cousin, Marion, known as "Lil Daddy" died three days after being shot while riding in a car.

References

External links
 
Marcus Denmon at euroleague.net
Marcus Denmon at legabasket.it 
Marcus Denmon at lnb.fr 
Marcus Denmon at mutigers.com
Marcus Denmon at tblstat.net

1990 births
Living people
All-American college men's basketball players
American expatriate basketball people in China
American expatriate basketball people in France
American expatriate basketball people in Greece
American expatriate basketball people in Italy
American expatriate basketball people in Turkey
American men's basketball players
Basketball players from Kansas City, Missouri
Beijing Royal Fighters players
Élan Chalon players
Gaziantep Basketbol players
İstanbul Büyükşehir Belediyespor basketball players
Missouri Tigers men's basketball players
New Basket Brindisi players
Panathinaikos B.C. players
Peristeri B.C. players
Petkim Spor players
Point guards
San Antonio Spurs draft picks
Shooting guards
Tofaş S.K. players
Zhejiang Golden Bulls players